"Weird Al" Yankovic Live! is a live video recording of "Weird Al" Yankovic's concert during the Touring With Scissors tour, at the Marin County Civic Center, in San Rafael, California, on October 2, 1999. For legal reasons, video clips and several unreleased songs from the medley were not included.

The concert video includes live versions of:
 "Gump" (from Bad Hair Day album)
 "Polka Power" (from Running with Scissors album)
 (drum solo)
 "Jerry Springer" (from Running with Scissors album)
 "My Baby's In Love With Eddie Vedder" (from Running with Scissors album)
 "The Night Santa Went Crazy" (Extra Gory Version) (from Bad Hair Day album)
 "Dare to Be Stupid" (from Dare to Be Stupid album)
 "It's All About The Pentiums" (from Running with Scissors album)
 "Germs" (from Running with Scissors album)
 "One More Minute" (from Dare to Be Stupid album)
 "Like a Surgeon" (Madonna's "Truth or Dare" Remix) (from Dare to Be Stupid album)
 "Pretty Fly for a Rabbi" / "Another One Rides the Bus" / "I Love Rocky Road" / "Achy Breaky Song" / "Jurassic Park" / "Grapefruit Diet" / "I Lost on Jeopardy" / "Eat It"
 "Smells Like Nirvana" (from Off the Deep End album)
 "Bedrock Anthem" (from Alapalooza album)
 "Amish Paradise" (from Bad Hair Day album)
 "Fat" (from Even Worse album)
 "The Saga Begins" (from Running with Scissors album)
 "Yoda" (from Dare to Be Stupid album)

It also includes the music videos for "The Saga Begins" and "It's All About The Pentiums", both from Running with Scissors.

The DVD version also includes clips from Al TV and a photo gallery with 27 photos. The music videos also have commentaries by Yankovic.

External links

"Weird Al" Yankovic live albums
"Weird Al" Yankovic video albums
1999 live albums
1999 video albums
Live video albums
San Rafael, California
1990s English-language films